Holly Gagnier (born December 12, 1958) is an American actress.

Early life
Gagnier was born in Los Angeles, California. Her parents were Hugh Gagnier, a cinematographer and Eleanor Gagnier, a stenographer for the United Nations.
Eleanor served as a stenographer on the Nuremberg trials. Holly is one of five siblings.

Career
A former actress, Gagnier's notable roles include long running stints on daytime's One Life to Live, Days of Our Lives in the ground-breaking role of young teen mother Ivy Jannings, and on General Hospital as the insane Jennifer Smith. While on One Life to Live, she appeared on the Oprah Winfrey Show as one of daytime's most popular characters. She was a series regular on Baywatch, and has had recurring roles on several television series including Pacific Blue, Middle Ages, and as a young teen on House Calls opposite Lynn Redgrave. She has been seen on television shows including Scandal, Private Practice, House, Perception, Friends (as one of Joey's sisters), ER, Dream On, and Ringer to name a few. She has performed in several theater productions both in New York City and Los Angeles, most recently in "God of Carnage" and "Yellow Face," as well as Christopher Durang's "Beyond Therapy". Gagnier recently completed the Hallmark movie Kiss on Candy Cane Lane and The Stalker Club for Lifetime with fellow soap vet Maeve Quinlan. On the big screen, she made her debut in New World Pictures'cult classic  Girls Just Want to Have Fun, Gun, Son of an Afghan Farmer, the cult film Free Enterprise, The Undertaker's Wedding, and Breakout. Currently, she can be seen in the award-winning Reckless Juliets" on Amazon. Gagnier has a penchant for being in short films and has been in several award-winning shorts on the film festival circuit in the last few years.

Gagnier currently just finished the pilot "A Family Affair" opposite  Crazy Ex-Girlfirneds Pete Gardner, as well as on Brat's huge YouTube hit Chicken Girls and Baby Doll Records as the evil Robin Robbins, where she just completed Season 3.

The last several years Ms. Gagnier has focused more on teaching and coaching actors. She is known as "Hollywoods Secret Weapon" among talent representatives. She has amassed a huge client list which includes Oscar and Emmy winners. Ms. Gagnier is also known for coaching some of Los Angeles most prominent lawyers on their closing arguments.

Gagnier started a mentorship program where she coaches young artists on their career paths.

Personal life

Gagnier is very involved in veterans’ charities. She is a sponsor of Task Force Omega. She has also produced one of Los Angeles‘ longest running plays "Welcome Home Soldier A Tribute to Vietnam Veterans", which ran for 25 years at Playhouse West. All proceeds from the production went directly to Veterans charities.

Gagnier has been linked to some notable men. Gagnier was seriously involved with actor Alec Baldwin for seven years. She was also linked to Hall of Fame Pitcher Jim Palmer. In 1999, she had one child.  After her divorce in 2002, she dated and ultimately became engaged in 2009 to actor Parker Stevenson (they played a married couple a decade earlier on Baywatch'').

Gagnier currently resides in Los Angeles with her daughter.

Filmography
n.b. for credit listings reference

Video Game

Film

Television

References

External links
 
 
 
 
 

1958 births
Living people
20th-century American actresses
21st-century American actresses
Actresses from Los Angeles
American film actresses
American soap opera actresses
American television actresses